Rogerella is a small pouch-shaped boring (a type of trace fossil) with a slit-like aperture currently produced by acrothoracican barnacles. These crustaceans extrude their legs upwards through the opening for filter-feeding (Seilacher, 1969; Lambers and Boekschoten, 1986). They are known in the fossil record as borings in carbonate substrates (shells and hardgrounds) from the Devonian to the Recent (Taylor and Wilson, 2003).

References
 
 
 

Fossil taxa described in 2016